Foxface may refer to:

 Foxface (band)
 Foxface, a Hunger Games character
 Foxface rabbitfish, a common name for the fish siganus vulpinus
 Solanum mammosum, a fruit known as Fox Face (フォックスフェイス) in Japan